The National Library of the Kingdom of Morocco (Amazigh: ⵜⴰⵙⴷⵍⵉⵙⵜ ⵜⴰⵏⴰⵎⵓⵔⵜ ⵏ ⵜⴳⵍⴷⵉⵜ ⵜⴰⵎⵔⵔⵓⴽⵉⵜ; , previously Bibliothèque générale and Bibliothèque générale et Archives) is located in Rabat, Morocco with a branch in Tetouan. The former Bibliothèque Générale (General Library) was created in 1924. In 2003, it was renamed the "Bibliothèque nationale du Royaume du Maroc."

History
The first national library of Morocco was founded in 1924 by the French Protectorate in Morocco. After a dahir (royal decrée) in 1926, it became a public establishment. Tétouan native Muhammad Abu Khubza authored a library catalog for the branch in that city in 1984.

The present building in Rabat-Agdal was designed by architects Rachid Andaloussi and Abdelouahed Mountassir of Casablanca and inaugurated by King Mohammed VI on 15 October 2008. Inspired by the square minarets of traditional Moroccan architecture, the building houses a main building with an adjacent tower, topped with a glass roof and decorated with modern Arabic calligraphy. There are also a spacious courtyard and other outdoor spaces for cultural performances and events.

See also 
 Archives du Maroc, in Rabat
 List of national libraries

References

Bibliography
  . (Includes discussion of items held in the library)
 
 
  
 . (Includes information about the national library)

External links 
 Official site of Bibliothèque Nationale du Royaume du Maroc
 VIAF. Bibliothèque générale et archives du Maroc

Libraries in Morocco
Morocco
Moroccan culture
Buildings and structures in Rabat
1924 establishments in Morocco
Libraries established in 1924
20th-century architecture in Morocco